The Computer Music Center (CMC) at Columbia University is the oldest center for electronic and computer music research in the United States. It was founded in the 1950s as the Columbia-Princeton Electronic Music Center.

Location 
The CMC is housed in Prentis Hall, 632 West 125th Street, New York City, across the street from Columbia's 17-acre Manhattanville campus. The facility consists of a large graduate research facility specializing in computer music and multimedia research, as well as a number of composition and recording studios for student use. Projects to come out of the CMC since the 1990s include:

 ArtBots
 dorkbot
 PeRColate
 Real-Time Cmix

The Computer Music Center offers the Sound Arts MFA Program, currently directed by Miya Masaoka. The program was formerly directed by Douglas Repetto until 2016. The director of the CMC is Brad Garton, and the CMC offers classes taught by George E. Lewis, Seth Cluett, David Soldier, and Ben Holtzman, as well as a large number of visiting faculty who give seminars every year.

History
The forerunner of the Columbia-Princeton Electronic Music Center was a studio founded in the early 1950s by Columbia University professors Vladimir Ussachevsky and Otto Luening, and Princeton University professors Milton Babbitt and Roger Sessions. Originally concerned with experiments in music composition involving the new technology of reel-to-reel tape, the studio soon branched out into all areas of electronic music research. The center was officially established with a grant from the Rockefeller Foundation in 1959 which was used to finance the acquisition of the RCA Mark II Sound Synthesizer from its owner, RCA.

The center's flagship piece of equipment, the RCA Mark II Sound Synthesizer, was delivered in 1957 after it was developed to Ussachevsky and Babbitt's specifications. The RCA (and the center) were re-housed in Prentis Hall, a building off the main Columbia campus on 125th Street. A number of significant pieces in the electronic music repertoire were realized on the Synthesizer, including Babbitt's Vision and Prayer and Charles Wuorinen's Time's Encomium, which was awarded the 1970 Pulitzer Prize in Music. In 1964 Columbia Records released an album titled simply Columbia-Princeton Electronic Music Center, which was produced principally on the RCA synthesizer.

Most of the luminaries in the field of electronic music (and avant-garde music in general) visited, worked, or studied at the Electronic Music Center, including Edgard Varèse, Chou Wen-chung, Halim El-Dabh, Michiko Toyama, Bülent Arel, Mario Davidovsky, Charles Dodge, Pril Smiley, Alice Shields, Wendy Carlos, Dariush Dolat-Shahi, Kenjiro Ezaki and Luciano Berio. The center also acted as a consulting agency for other electronic music studios in the Western Hemisphere, giving them advice on optimum studio design and helping them purchase equipment.

The staff engineers at the center under Peter Mauzey developed a large variety of customized equipment designed to solve the needs of the composers working at the center. These include early prototypes of tape delay machines, quadraphonic mixing consoles, and analog triggers designed to facilitate interoperability between other (often custom-made) synthesizer equipment. The center also had a large collection of Buchla, Moog, and Serge Modular synthesizers.

By the late 1970s the Electronic Music Center was rapidly nearing obsolescence as the classical analog tape techniques it used were being surpassed by parallel work in the field of computer music. By the mid-1980s the Columbia and Princeton facilities had ceased their formal affiliation, with the Princeton music department strengthening its affiliation with Bell Labs and founding a computer music studio under Godfrey Winham and Paul Lansky (see Princeton Sound Lab).

The original Columbia facility was re-organized in 1995 under the leadership of Brad Garton and was renamed the Columbia University Computer Music Center.

Notable people associated with CMC 
 Bradford Garton, Director, Professor of Music
 Seth Cluett, Assistant Director
 Miya Masaoka, Director of the Sound Arts MFA Program
 Fred Lerdahl, Professor of Music
 George E. Lewis, Professor of Music
 Zosha Di Castri, Assistant Professor of Music

References 

External links
 Columbia history of the Electronic Music Center
 Ohm site on the Electronic Music Center
 The Computer Music Center, Columbia University
 Princeton Sound Lab

 Finding aid to the Columbia-Princeton Electronic Music Center records at Columbia University. Rare Book & Manuscript Library.

Electronic music organizations
Information technology organizations based in North America
Experimental Music Studios
Columbia University